Fred Perry defeated Jack Crawford 6–3, 11–13, 4–6, 6–0, 6–1 in the final to win the men's singles tennis title at the 1933 U.S. National Championships. It was Perry's first Grand Slam title overall, and the first of three US Championships.

Seeds
The tournament used two lists of eight players for seeding the men's singles event; one for U.S. players and one for foreign players. Fred Perry is the champion; others show the round in which they were eliminated.

  Ellsworth Vines (fourth round)
  Frank Shields (semifinals)
  Wilmer Allison (fourth round)
  Clifford Sutter (quarterfinals)
  Frank Parker (third round)
  Sidney Wood (fourth round)
  Lester Stoefen (semifinals)
  Gregory Mangin (quarterfinals)

  Jack Crawford (finalist)
  Fred Perry (champion)
  Jiro Satoh (fourth round)
  Harry Lee (fourth round)
  Ryosuke Nunoi (fourth round)
  Vivian McGrath (fourth round)
  Eikichi Ito (second round)
  Adrian Quist (quarterfinals)

Draw

Final eight

Earlier rounds

Section 1

Section 2

Section 3

Section 4

Section 5

Section 6

Section 7

Section 8

References

External links
 1933 U.S. National Championships on ITFtennis.com, the source for this draw

Men's Singles
1933